Pymble railway station is located on the North Shore line, serving the Sydney suburb of Pymble. It is served by Sydney Trains T1 North Shore line services.

History
Pymble station opened on 1 January 1890 when the North Shore line opened from Hornsby to St Leonards. The present island platform and station building were completed in 1909 in when the line was duplicated. In March of 2021, plans to improve the accessibility of the station were approved. The upgrade will feature three lifts, footpath upgrades, new handrails, and other features. The upgrade is expected to be completed in 2023.

Services

Transport links
Transdev NSW operates one route to and from Pymble station:
579: to East Turramurra

Pymble station is served by one NightRide route:
N90: Hornsby station to Town Hall station

References

External links

 Pymble Station details Transport for New South Wales  (Archived 20 June 2019)

Railway stations in Sydney
Railway stations in Australia opened in 1890
North Shore railway line
Pymble, New South Wales